Break of Dawn is the debut album by Do As Infinity, released in 2000. The cover of this album is the only one by the group where Dai Nagao is included in along with the other two members. The song "Raven" was used as the ending theme for the Japanese horror film Uzumaki.

Track listing

Chart positions

External links
 Break of Dawn at Avex Network
 Break of Dawn at Oricon

2000 albums
Do As Infinity albums
Avex Group albums
Albums produced by Seiji Kameda